James Vivian Roberts (19 November 1931 – 12 August 2013) was an Australian rules footballer who played with Geelong in the Victorian Football League (VFL).

Notes

External links 

1931 births
2013 deaths
Australian rules footballers from Victoria (Australia)
Geelong Football Club players